Remarriage & Desires is a 2022 South Korean television series directed by Kim Jeong-min and starring Kim Hee-sun, Lee Hyun-wook, Cha Ji-yeon, Jung Yoo-jin, and Park Hoon. This series is a satire on the Korean society that tells the desire in the remarriage market,  revolving around upper-class marriage information companies. It premiered on July 15, 2022 on Netflix.

Synopsis
Seo Hye-seung who lost everything in an instant after living as a middle-class housewife in Gangnam, reunites with the woman who upended her life at Rex, a marriage information company for the upper class, and participates in the race of her desires for her revenge.

Cast

Main
 Kim Hee-sun as Seo Hye-seung, a teacher in Gangnam.
 Lee Hyun-wook as Lee Hyeong-joo, a venture company executive.
 Jung Yoo-jin as Jin Yoo-hee, a lawyer at a large corporation with a desire to become the top class.
 Cha Ji-yeon as Choi Yoo-seon, a representative of Rex, the country's top-class professional marriage company.
 Park Hoon as Cha Seok-jin, a professor who has a conflict with Choi Yoo-seon over his father's enormous fortune.

Supporting
 Park Sang-hoon as Lee Jun-ho, son of Lee Hyeong-joo. 
 Kim Sa-kwon as Joo Ho-chan, Lee Hyeong-joo's friends
 Lady Jane as station announcer
 Kim Mi-kyung as Lee Hyeong-joo's mother
 Kim Young-hoon as Choi Seong-jae, President of a leading game company. 
 Kim So-ra as Prof. Jung Mi-jin, University professor 
 Kim Yoon-seo as Heo Jung-in, Lee Hyung-ju's ex wife
 Kim Seon-kyung as Sec. Go Ae-ran, secretary of the Blue House 
 Lee Doo-seok as Prof. Park Jin-hwan
 Baek Joo-hee as Ha Yeong-seo
 Baek Seung-hee as Han Jung-ok
 Jung Woo-hyuk as Engr. Ryu Won-ho
 Yang Mal-bok as Min Na-rae

Special appearance 
 Park Ji-hoon as Choi Yoo-seon's customers

Production

Development
On July 21, 2021, Netflix confirmed through a press release the production of Korean original series Remarriage & Desires, a satire on Korean society in which people hope to upgrade their status by marrying or remarrying into the ranks of the elite. Netflix further revealed that the series to be directed by Kim Jung-min, written by Lee Geun-yeong and produced by Image9 Communications and Tiger Studio, will have cast of Kim Hee-seon, Lee Hyun-wook, Jung Yu-jin, Park Hoon and Cha Ji-yeon.

Casting
In July casting in the series was confirmed by Kim Hee-sun, Lee Hyeon-wook, Jung Yu-jin, Park Hoon and Cha Ji-yeon.

Filming
Filming began on July 25, 2021 after script reading on the 6th.

Reception
Jonathon Wilson of Ready Steady Cut graded the TV series with 3 stars out of 5 and criticised the series writing, "Both its character drama and its rather fanciful depiction of high-class matchmaking — including human chess boards and masquerade balls — can border on silly.". Summarising his review Wilson said that "Remarriage & Desires runs the risk of being a bit too melodramatic for its own good, but its handsome production and intriguing revenge plot just about do the job." Kate Sánchez writing in Butwhythopodcast termed the series "a thrilling ride with eight episodes that push the pedal to the floor and never lets up." Concluding her review Sánchez opined that "the drama is intense," and stated, "Every single woman in the series gets their due, and show how they have power even when the men in their lives should be the ones calling the shots by society’s standards." Pierce Conran of the South China Morning Post rated the series with 2.5 out of 5 stars and praising the performance of Jung Eugene wrote, "Jung Eugene stands out for her delivery of cold, calculating evil." Conran also appreciated the cinematographer Jo Yeon-soo, writing, "Jo Yeon-soo draws notice for his smooth camerawork." Summarising Conran wrote, "For a show that’s less than half the length of other primetime soaps, what’s immediately apparent about Remarriage & Desires is how slow the build-up of the story is and how listless it remains until the final couple of episodes."

Sarah Musnicky writing in Butwhythopodcast rated the series 8.5/10 and wrote, "It’s a delightful dramatic mess of a show."  Musnicky further stated, "Full of melodrama akin to a soap opera, viewers will be taken along for the ride and, with any luck, perhaps we might get a second season."

References

External links
 
 
 
 
 Remarriage & Desires at Daum 

South Korean drama web series
2022 web series debuts
South Korean web series
2022 South Korean television series debuts
South Korean satire
Korean-language Netflix original programming